Sarinah Building is a 74-metre tall 15-floor department store in Gondangdia, Menteng, Central Jakarta, Indonesia. It was the first skyscraper to be built in Jakarta.

Sarinah is located at the intersection of Jalan Kyai Haji Wahid Hasyim and Jalan M. H. Thamrin. It was Jakarta's first modern department store, famous for having Indonesia's first escalators (installed by Hitachi), for being air-conditioned and for having electronic cash registers.

History 

PT Department Store Indonesia "Sarinah" (former company name of Sarinah) first piled the foundation of Sarinah building on 23 April 1963.  The building was built by Obayashi Corporation and state-owned construction company Adhi Karya, using Japanese war reparation funds.  The building was handed over to Sarinah on 22 December 1965, coinciding with Mother's Day, and was inaugurated on 15 August 1966.

In the 1990s, after leasing out some of its space to McDonald's (its first branch in Indonesia) and Hard Rock Cafe (which later moved to Pacific Place Jakarta), Sarinah managed to rejuvenate itself as a popular place for young people.

Expansion 
Two forty-one story towers are planned to be built in the area to complement the existing shopping center. The new towers will house high end restaurants; offices; and venues for meetings, conferences, and exhibition halls. The existing building will undergo major renovations to restore the originality of the building. The expansion project is expected to start by July 2020 and is projected to be completed in its entirety by mid-2022. 

For the renovation to be carried out on the existing building, the management ordered all tenants of to close in a 30 April 2020 memo. Notably the closing of the first McDonald's in Indonesia at the Sarinah location on 10 May 2020 attracted a considerable crowd and legal rebuke for violation of social distancing laws in effect for the endless COVID-19 pandemic at the time.

After completion of renovations on the existing building, it was opened to public on 22 March, 2022.

2016 terrorist incident
On 14 January 2016, multiple explosions and gunfire occurred near Sarinah. The Islamic State of Iraq and the Levant (ISIL) claimed responsibility. 8 people were killed, 4 civilians and all 4 attackers.

References

Cited works

InJourney
Central Jakarta
Shopping malls in Jakarta
Skyscrapers in Indonesia
Buildings and structures in Jakarta